What Comes After is the third album by Norwegian jazz guitarist Terje Rypdal recorded in 1973 and released on the ECM label.

Reception
The Allmusic review awarded the album 3 stars.

Track listing
All compositions by Terje Rypdal except as indicated
 "Bend It" - 9:55 
 "Yearning" - 3:22 
 "Icing" (Jon Christensen, Terje Rypdal) - 7:50 
 "What Comes After" - 10:58 
 "Sejours" (Barre Phillips) - 3:51 
 "Back of J." (Phillips)  4:17 
Recorded at the Arne Bendiksen Studio in Oslo, Norway on August 7 & 8, 1973

Personnel
Terje Rypdal — guitar, flute
Erik Niord Larsen — oboe, English horn
Barre Phillips — bass, piccolo bass 
Sveinung Hovensjø — electric bass, 
Jon Christensen — percussion, organ

References

ECM Records albums
Terje Rypdal albums
1974 albums
Albums produced by Manfred Eicher